Cape Atholl, also known as Kangaarasuk, is a headland in Northwest Greenland, Avannaata municipality.

This cape was named by Commander James Saunders, after Atholl, the class to which his ship HMS North Star belonged, during the winter 1849–50 in which he was frozen in the bay to the north and named landmarks in the area.

History
Cape Atholl was a United States Coast Guard LORAN station in Northwest Greenland, south of Thule Air Base. It was established in 1954 and disestablished in 1975.
Latitude:  76°18'56.62"N
Longitude:  69°21'21.03"W

Geography
Cape Atholl is located in the mainland, in the eastern shore of Bylot Sound, Baffin Bay. It rises at the southern end of the mouth of Wolstenholme Fjord and opposite the eastern end of Wolstenholme Island.

References

External links
Greenland Pilot - Danish Geodata Agency

Atholl
1954 establishments in Greenland
1975 disestablishments in Greenland
Military installations established in 1954
Military installations closed in 1975